The rufous-tailed babbler (Moupinia poecilotis) is a bird species in the family Paradoxornithidae. As with many other species known as "babblers", it was formerly placed in the family Sylviidae. It is endemic to central China.

The genus Moupinia was introduced by the French ornithologists Armand David and Émile Oustalet in 1877.

References

Collar, N. J. & Robson, C. 2007. Family Timaliidae (Babblers)  pp. 70 – 291 in; del Hoyo, J., Elliott, A. & Christie, D.A. eds. Handbook of the Birds of the World, Vol. 12. Picathartes to Tits and Chickadees. Lynx Edicions, Barcelona.

rufous-tailed babbler
Birds of Central China
Endemic birds of China
rufous-tailed babbler
Taxonomy articles created by Polbot